Moore Ministry may refer to:

Moore Ministry (Queensland) 1929-1932
Moore Ministry (Western Australia) 1906-1910